The 2018–19 Vancouver Canucks season was the 49th season for the National Hockey League franchise that was established on May 22, 1970. On July 25, 2018, president of hockey operations, Trevor Linden left the organization and his role was assumed by general manager Jim Benning. The Canucks were eliminated from playoff contention on March 29, 2019, after the Colorado Avalanche's overtime win against the Arizona Coyotes.

Off season
On June 22, the Canucks drafted Quinn Hughes with the seventh overall pick in the 2018 NHL Entry Draft. They also selected Jett Woo, Tyler Madden, Toni Utunen, Artyom Manukyan and Matthew Thiessen.

Regular season

Standings

Schedule and results

Pre-season
The Canucks released their pre-season schedule on June 13, 2018.

Regular season
The regular season schedule was released on June 21, 2018.

Detailed records

Player statistics
Final stats

Skaters

Goaltenders

†Denotes player spent time with another team before joining the Canucks. Stats reflect time with the Canucks only.
‡Denotes player was traded mid-season. Stats reflect time with the Canucks only.
Bold/italics denotes franchise record.

Awards and honours

Awards

Milestones

Records

Transactions
The Canucks have been involved in the following transactions during the 2018–19 season.

Trades

Free agents

Waivers

Contract terminations

Retirement

Signings

Draft picks

Below are the Vancouver Canucks' selections at the 2018 NHL Entry Draft, which was held on June 22 and 23, 2018, at the American Airlines Center in Dallas, Texas.

Notes:
 The Washington Capitals' sixth-round pick went to the Vancouver Canucks as the result of a trade on June 23, 2018, that sent a sixth-round pick in 2018 (161st overall) to Washington in exchange for a sixth-round pick in 2019 and this pick.

References

Vancouver Canucks seasons
Vancouver Canucks
Canucks